Protium pittieri (Spanish: alcanfor) is a species of plant in the Burseraceae family. It is found in Costa Rica and Panama. It is threatened by habitat loss.

References

pittieri
Vulnerable plants
Taxonomy articles created by Polbot